The Law Society of New South Wales is a professional association which represents over 29,000 solicitors in Australia. The Law Society has statutory powers and regulates the practice of law in New South Wales.

The Law Society of NSW encourages debate and actively drives law reform issues through policy submissions and open dialogue with governments, parliamentary bodies, the courts and the New South Wales Department of Justice. It ensures the general public has appropriate access to justice and can be easily connected to members of the profession when they require legal advice.

Along with the Office of the Legal Services Commissioner, the Law Society sets and enforces professional standards, licenses solicitors to practise, investigates complaints and administers discipline to ensure both the community and the profession are properly served by ethical and responsible solicitors.

History
The Law Society was informally started in 1842.  In 1884, the society was formalized as "The Incorporated Law Institute of New South Wales", and had its first annual meeting the following year.

In 1960, the institute was renamed to "The Law Society of New South Wales".  In 1963, the Society started publishing The Law Society Journal. The society also established the College of Law in 1973, the Legal Practitioners Act 1987 (NSW), Law Industry Superannuation Trust (LIST) and LawCare in 1989, and the Office of the Legal Services Commissioner in 1992.

List of presidents

Structure and organisation
The Law Society is governed by an internal Council, the Legal Profession Act 2004 (NSW) and the Corporations Act 2001 (Cth). The Council meets monthly and has 21 elected members who sit for 3 year terms and one appointed member who sits for 1 year.  The Council has 2 country lawyer councillors, 2 suburban lawyer councillors, 2 city lawyer councillors, 2 corporate lawyer councillors, 2 government lawyer councillors, 2 large firm lawyer councillors, 1 NSW Young Lawyers councillor (appointed), and 8 general councillors. Law Society Councillors sit on the boards of LawCover (legal insurer), the NSW Legal Practitioners Fidelity Fund, the Legal Profession Admissions Board, the Public Interest Advocacy Centre (among others).

The Law Society has 23 committees devoted to different aspects of law.

Pro-bono work
The society started a voluntary "Pro Bono Scheme" in 1992.

See also
Australian and New Zealand Law and History Society
Law Council of Australia
Law Institute of Victoria
Law society

References

External links
 
 Law Society Journal

Legal organisations based in Australia
New South Wales
Organizations established in 1884
1884 establishments in Australia